The 1996 Nabisco Dinah Shore was a women's professional golf tournament, held March 28–31 at Mission Hills Country Club in Rancho Mirage, California. This was the 25th edition of the Nabisco Dinah Shore, and the fourteenth as a major championship.

Patty Sheehan won her only Nabisco Dinah Shore, one stroke ahead of runners-up Meg Mallon, Kelly Robbins, and Annika Sörenstam. She sank a  putt for par on the final hole to avoid a four-way playoff and win the last of her six major titles.

Past champions in the field

Made the cut

Source:

Missed the cut

Source:

Final leaderboard
Sunday, March 31, 1996

Source:

References

External links
Golf Observer leaderboard

Chevron Championship
Golf in California
Nabisco Dinah Shore
Nabisco Dinah Shore
Nabisco Dinah Shore
Nabisco Dinah Shore
Women's sports in California